Giuseppe Di Bianco (born 17 October 1969) is an Italian composer, conductor, arranger, mainly of choral music.

Biography

Education 
Giuseppe Di Bianco holds degrees in Piano, Composition, Choral conducting and Music Didactics from the Conservatories of Salerno and  San Pietro a Majella of Naples,  graduating Summa cum Laude and Honorable Mention in Foreign Languages and Modern Literature, with a post Lauream Master at Rome University. The meetings with Pietro D'Amico and the Hungarian pianist György Sándor, a student of Béla Bartók and Zoltán Kodály, are fundamental for his artistic training. Enrico Buondonno, direct heir of the didactic tradition of Licinio Refice, Raffaele Casimiri, Achille Longo started him to study the composition. He will be deeply bound by a profound educational and human relationship, which lasted over two decades.
His training also includes advanced courses and workshops at Accademia Musicale Chigiana in Siena and Scuola di Musica of Fiesole (Florence) with Giacomo Manzoni, Salvatore Sciarrino, Louis Andriessen, Peter Maxwell Davies, Luis de Pablo;  analysis seminars with Jean - Jacques Nattiez, Janet Schmalfeldt (Tufts University, MA).

Artistic activity 
Active as a pianist, teacher, and composer, with the main interest in choral composition, published by Feniarco Ed. (IT), Federcoritrentino e «Композитор • Санкт-Петербург» Publishing House and performed in Italy, Europe (France, Switzerland, Denmark, Latvia, Slovenia, Netherlands, Germany, Spain, Portugal), USA, Russia, Japan, Philippine, he has received numerous awards in composition competitions, obtaining the first prize in the International Composition Competition "Cesare Augusto Seghizzi" of Gorizia in 2016, and presiding over the jury of the composition Trophy for the 2017 edition. 
His choral works have been commissioned and performed by international ensembles, including "The University of the Philippines Singing Ambassadors", Zürcher Sing-Akademie (CH), Coro Giovanile Italiano, Coro da Camera di Torino, Academic Mixed Choir "Vasilyev" (Russia), 
Coro di Voci Bianche of Santa Cecilia Academy, Rome, "Academic choir of Aarhus" (DK), "E STuudio Noortenkor" (EST), "San Josè State University Choraliers" (San Josè, CA, USA).

His choral music has been performed and included as part of the main international music festivals: National and International Choral Competition "Guido d'Arezzo”, International Choral Competition “Cesare Augusto Seghizzi" of Gorizia, Vittorio Veneto National Choral Competition, International Choral Competition "J. Gallus" of Maribor (Slovenia), International "Cracovia Cantans" Festival (PO), "Rainbow Petersburg Choir Festival", St. Petersburg (RU), Festival MITO SettembreMusica(IT), Salerno Festival, Fondazione Pietà dei Turchini|Fondazione "Pietà dei Turchini" of Naples; URTIcanti Contemporary Music Festival, Bari; International Milan Expo 2016, International Festival della Liuteria of Cremona, Rassegna concertistica di Villa Rufolo, Ravello.

He has been was invited as  guest composer  at North Carolina University (Chapel Hill Campus, NC, USA)  and at "Fine Arts and Music University" (愛知県立芸術大学) of Aichi, Japan.

In 2014 he is selected among the composers included in the "Invisible Cities Project", an international compositional project inspired by the novel of the same name by Italo Calvino and aimed at transposing the text "Invisible Cities" into music, commissioned to a group of composers, including Carlo Domeniconi, Victor Koulaphides, Alexey Larin, Joe Schittino.

In 2017 he is officially invited to join the Italian national project "Officina Corale del Futuro", promoted by "FENIARCO", with his composition  Lumen  (SATB) premiered in Florence, in Santa Maria Novella church.

Some of his compositions have been recorded by "Coro da Camera di Torino" (CDs "Made in Italy", 2015; "Passio Domini Jesu Christi", 2018), and included in the online PROJECT : ENCORE™  of Schola Cantorum on Hudson.

He is a member of the FENIARCO National Artistic Commission; Artistic Director of "Franco Di Franco" Musical Competition and "Wilhelm Kempff" piano Award of Positano, in the enchanting Coast of Amalfi (IT).

Awards and special honors

Awards 

 2019 - International Award "CostieraArte 2019", for his musical activities - City of Maiori, Coast of Amalfi
 2016 - Winner of the 13th International Trophy of Choral Composition "Cesare Augusto Seghizzi" (Gorizia, Italy)
 2014 - 1st prize, VIII International "Contemporalia" Choral Composition Competition (Badajoz, Spain)
 2012 - 1st prize, V International "Choir Laboratory, XXI Century" Competition  (St. Petersburg, Russia)
 2012 - 1st prize, XI "A.C.P." National Choral Composition Competition, Regione Piemonte (Italy)
 2010 - 1st prize, X  "A.C.P." National Choral Composition Competition (Regione Piemonte, Italy)
 2010 - 2nd prize  (1st not assigned), III National Choral Composition Prize "A.R.C.C.", La canzone napoletana in polifonia (Italy)
 2008 - 1st prize, International Choral Award "José Ribeiro de Sousa" (Alqueidão da Sierra, Portugal)
 2008 - 1st Prize, Opera Omnia Choral Prize, Fiumefreddo di Sicilia (Catania, Italy)
 2008 - 1st prize, IX "A.C.P." National  Choral Composition Competition, Regione Piemonte (Italy)
 2008 - 1st prize, II National Choral Composition Prize "A.R.C.C.", La canzone napoletana in polifonia (Italy)
 2008 - 2nd prize (1st not assigned), 2nd International Choral Composition Competition (Vittorio Veneto, TV, Italy)
 2008 - 2nd prize, "F.M. Napolitano" Composition National Award 2007 (Naples, Italy)
 2007 - 1st prize, Choral Composition Contest "Soldanella" of Brentonico (Trento, Italy), 2007 
 2007 - 2nd prize (1st not assigned), National Composition Prize "Franco Michele Napolitano" (Naples, Italy)
 2005 - Finalist, II International Competition for Choral Composition "C.A. Seghizzi" (Gorizia, Italy)
 2004 - 2nd prize, T.I.M. International Music Tournament Award  (Rome / Paris, 2004)
 2003 - 3rd prize, International Drum open competition (Fermo, AN, Italy)     
 2003 - Finalist, "Helmut Laberer" Composition Prize, Conservatory of Santa Cecilia (Rome, Italy)
 2002 - 2nd prize, X  International Prize of Cortemilia (Cuneo, Italy)
 2001 - 1st prize ex-aequo, XI International Choral Composition Award by Federcoritrentino (Trento, Italy)

Honorable mentions and special honors 

 2013 - FENIARCO  Special Award  (Italian National Choral Federation) for an original choral work on Neapolitan language (Naples, Italy)
 2008 - "Franco Caracciolo" Award (audience prize), VIII Sacred Choral Composition Prize on a Lutheran text (Naples, Italy)
 2008 - Honorable Mention, International Choral Award  "José Ribeiro de Sousa" (Alqueidão da Sierra, Portugal)
 2007 - Honorable Mention, 7th Aliénor International Harpsichord Composition Competition, Salem College (Winston-Salem / NC, USA)
 2002 - Honorable Mention (no prize assigned), National Choral Composition Prize "P. Righele" (Malo, VC, Italy)

Choral Compositions  (selection) 

 Credo - SATB (2021)
 Aetherium (Itinerarium Dantis in Deum) - SATB divisi, a cappella (2021)
 Plaudite manibus - SATTB (2018)
 Lumen - SATB a cappella (2017)
 The Fairy Lullaby - 2 soli, SSA, Fl, piano (2016)
 Alleluja - SATB, organo (2016)
 In pace - SSATB a cappella (2014)
 Victimae paschali laudes - SATB a cappella (2013)
 Madonna de lu Carmene - Solo, SATB (2011) 
 Angele Dei - SATB a cappella (2010) 
 Silentium (Volatizzazione di Dosso Casina) - TTBB a cappella (2007) 
 In laude - SATB divisi, a cappella (2004)
 Salmo 95 – SATB, piano (2002)
 Ave Maria – SATB (o SSAA) a cappella (1996)
 Agnus Dei – SATB a cappella (1992)

Essays 
 Introduzione alla analisi stilistica e retorica, Convegno di Studi a cura della Fondazione "F. Menna", Salerno, 1998 
 Linguaggi, inventio, percorsi critici tra tradizione e contemporaneità, in Atti del XXXVI Convegno Europeo di Studi "Seghizzi", sez. musicologia, Ed.Uffico stampa Seghizzi, Gorizia, 2005
 Melopoiesis. La musicalizzazione del testo letterario nella letteratura modernista inglese, Università degli Studi di Salerno, 2008
 La musica italiana nel Risorgimento, 2011
 InCanti di Sirene: topografia musicale di un mito, dal Mediterraneo ai Mari del Nord, 2012

Bibliography 
 Atti del XXXVI Convegno Europeo di Studi "Seghizzi", sez. musicologia,(pp. 195–217) Ed. Ufficio stampa Seghizzi, Gorizia, 2005 
 Autori vari, Armonie in concorso all' XI Concorso Internazionale di Composizione Corale, Ed. Federcoritrentino, 2002
 Autori vari, Melos 3, nuove composizioni corali, Edizioni Musicali Feniarco, 2012
 E. Galvani e A. Ruo Rui(a cura di):Voci & Tradizione Piemonte, Canti della tradizione orale armonizzati o elaborati per coro, Ed. Feniarco, San Vito al Tagliamento; ACP, Piemonte, 2012
 I. Vyaeslavovna Roganova (a cura di):"Хоровая лаборатория. XXI век. Музыка для детей и юношества. Выпуск 4", Ed. "Композитор • Санкт-Петербург", S. Pietroburgo, RUS, 2014

References

External links 

 Official Website
 "Encore" Project
  Positano News reportage, 16 August, 2017
 Concurso Internacional "Amadeus"
 University of the Philippines Singing Ambassadors, European Tour 2005
 International Choral Competition "Seghizzi", Italy 
 "An Italian Christmas" by Ken Hoover

1969 births
Living people
20th-century classical composers
21st-century classical composers
Italian classical composers
Italian male classical composers
20th-century Italian composers
20th-century Italian male musicians
21st-century Italian male musicians